The British Rail Class 81 is a class of AC electric locomotives that formerly operated on the West Coast Main Line of the London Midland Region of British Rail. Originally designated AL1, it was the first type of AC electric locomotive to be delivered to British Railways.

History 
As part of the modernisation of the West Coast Main Line, which included electrification, 100 locomotives of five types were acquired; each type from a different manufacturer.

The first locomotives to be delivered were type AL1, designed by British Thomson-Houston (BTH), an order being placed for 25 examples. Of these, 23 were for use on passenger trains with a top speed of 100 mph and were designated Type A. The other two locomotives were intended for freight train use, and geared for a top speed of 80 mph; these were designated Type B.

Before the work was completed, BTH amalgamated with Metropolitan Vickers to form AEI (Associated Electrical Industries) traction division and it was under this name that the locomotives were built in 1959 under subcontract by Birmingham Railway Carriage & Wagon in Smethwick. The first locomotive, E3001, was handed over to British Railways on 27 November 1959. The type was initially used for crew training on the Styal Line between Manchester and Crewe.

The AL1 were numbered E3001 - E3023 and E3096 / E3097; the first twenty-three being Type A and the last two Type B (numbered E3301 and E3302). However, these last two were actually geared for passenger service, being delivered in February 1964 as E3096 and E3097.

Power supply 
The locomotives always worked on power provided by overhead catenary, energised at 25,000 V AC. However, the main transformer, normally operated with the four windings in series, could be operated at 6250V AC with the transformer windings in parallel. This voltage was initially to be used where limited clearances gave concern over use of the higher voltage. However, this approach was never used on the West Coast main line, although it was employed elsewhere such as Glasgow Central in the initial 'Blue Train' electrification there. By the time the WCML wiring was extended to Glasgow, it had been revised there to the mainstream 25 kV voltage.

Operations 
The class only operated on the West Coast Main Line because they were restricted to lines electrified at 25 kV AC. Cities where these engines could be seen included London, Birmingham, Manchester, Liverpool and Glasgow. They operated passenger, freight and parcel trains. There is no record of operation on the ex-Great Eastern line, which was being electrified at the time of their introduction, nor subsequently on the East Coast Main Line (ECML) when that was electrified in the 1980s.

Renumbering 
Under the TOPS system, twenty-two examples were reclassified as class 81 and numbered 81001 - 81022.

Withdrawals 
Three locomotives (E3002, E3009 and E3019) were withdrawn before they could be renumbered under the TOPS system, which was implemented in 1972. E3002 and E3019 were damaged by fire and both were scrapped at British Rail Crewe Works. The remains of E3009 were also cut up at Crewe Works, the locomotive having been wrecked in the Hixon rail crash of January 1968.

Two further members of the class saw relatively early withdrawal due to accident or fire damage:
 
 

The remaining locomotives of the Class had relatively successful service lives of 25 to 30 years, although in their latter years they became unreliable, and displayed an increasing tendency to catch fire. However, a shortage of electric locomotives ruled out withdrawal of the fleet until the newer  locomotives came into service in the late-1980s. The remaining examples were withdrawn from service in the late-1980s and early-1990s. The last two examples withdrawn from service were 81012 and 81017 in July 1991. The majority of the class were scrapped at Coopers Metals in Sheffield.

Preservation 
One example, 81002, has been preserved by the AC Locomotive Group, located at Barrow Hill Engine Shed.

Models 
There have been no recent OO gauge models of the Class 81, although Hornby Dublo produced a model from 1964, prior to the purchase of Hornby by Lines Bros (owners of the Tri-ang Railways brand). This model was very crude, even by the standards of the day - a lack of cab interiors; a very crude pantograph; a lack of detail in the roof pan - but was issued under Tri-ang Hornby (predecessors to the current Hornby Railways brand) from 1966.

There has, however, been a static model in HO scale produced by Atlas Editions - some of these have been successfully motorised.

Fleet details

References

Sources

Further reading 

  Publisher: Associated Electrical Industries Ltd.

External links 

AC Locomotive Group - custodians of preserved locomotive no. 81002
AEI A.C. Type 'A' Electric Locomotives for British Railways, Nos. E3001-E3023 booklet

81
Bo-Bo locomotives
BRCW locomotives
25 kV AC locomotives
Railway locomotives introduced in 1959
Standard gauge locomotives of Great Britain